Cocalico Creek is a  tributary of the Conestoga River in Lebanon and Lancaster counties in Pennsylvania in the United States. The source is at an elevation of  near Stricklerstown in Millcreek Township, Lebanon County.

The name of the creek comes from the Lenape, meaning "snake dens". It comes from the Lenape word Gookcalicunk (pronounced "Gook Cal-eek Unk), which means "Snake Sleep Place" in English. The Lenape considered modern East Cocalico, West Cocalico, Clay, Warwick, Elizabeth, and Penn townships in Lancaster County, Mill Creek Township in Lebanon County, and the Middle Creek Wildlife Management Area as part of Gookcalicunk.

Tributaries
Hammer Creek
Middle Creek
Meadow Run
Indian Run
Cooper Run
Stony Run
Little Cocalico Creek

See also
List of rivers of Pennsylvania

References

Rivers of Pennsylvania
Tributaries of the Conestoga River
Rivers of Lancaster County, Pennsylvania
Rivers of Lebanon County, Pennsylvania